This is a list of productions by Warner Bros. Cartoons, a subsidiary of Warner Bros., which mainly produced the Looney Tunes and Merrie Melodies shorts. Other animated projects were made for Warner, as well as entities such as U.S. Army (Private Snafu) and U.S. Navy (Mr. Hook).

Looney Tunes and Merrie Melodies 

Warner Bros. Cartoons produced two series of animated shorts for commercial theatrical release, Looney Tunes (1930–1969) and Merrie Melodies (1931–1969). The Looney Tunes and Merrie Melodies shorts featuring Bugs Bunny were also sold  separately to distributors as Bugs Bunny Specials.  
 Looney Tunes and Merrie Melodies filmography (1929–1939)
 Looney Tunes and Merrie Melodies filmography (1940–1949)
 Looney Tunes and Merrie Melodies filmography (1950–1959)
 Looney Tunes and Merrie Melodies filmography (1960–1969)

TV series 
 The Bugs Bunny Show and various spin-offs (1960–1962)

Miscellaneous shorts 
The following is a list of various shorts outside of the Looney Tunes and Merrie Melodies series.

Spooney Melodies

Buster Bear theatrical shorts

Commercials

Other theatrical shorts

Government films

One Shots

Private Snafu series 

Note:All shorts in the main Private SNAFU series were created for the U.S. War Department and were created by Warner Bros., and written by Dr. Seuss. Cartoons unless otherwise noted. The films, being produced for the U.S. government, are in the public domain. Private Snafu was also featured in Few Quick Facts series but none of these shorts were produced by Warner Bros or Harman-Ising thus they are not included here.

Mr. Hook series 
Not listed below is Take Heed Mr. Tojo, released in August 1943. It was the first cartoon in the Hook series, but was produced at the Walter Lantz studio.

Miscellaneous films 
The following films feature animation from Warner Bros. Cartoons, ranging from simple title sequences to more complex sequences.

See also 
 Warner Bros. Cartoons
 Warner Animation Group
 Looney Tunes and Merrie Melodies filmography
 List of Warner Bros. theatrical animated features
 List of unproduced Warner Bros. Animation projects
 List of Warner Bros. Animation productions

References

Warner Bros. Cartoons
Warner Bros. Cartoons
Articles containing video clips